Monte Ricco is a mountain of the Veneto region of Italy. It has an elevation of 330 metres.

Mountains of Veneto